Diceroprocta viridifascia, known generally as the salt marsh cicada or seaside cicada, is a species of cicada in the family Cicadidae. It is found in North America.

References

Further reading

External links

 

Articles created by Qbugbot
Insects described in 1850
Diceroprocta